The Women's 100 metre butterfly competition at the 2017 World Championships was held on 23 and 24 July 2017.

Records
Prior to the competition, the existing world and championship records were as follows.

The following new records were set during this competition.

Results

Heats
The heats were held on 23 July at 09:30.

Semifinals
The semifinals were held on 23 July at 17:42.

Semifinal 1

Semifinal 2

Final
The final was held on 24 July at 17:40.

References

Women's 100 metre butterfly
2017 in women's swimming